Wojciech Bonenberg (born in 1950), is a Polish architect, academic teacher.

In 1973 he graduated from the Faculty of Architecture Silesian University of Technology. Then he began to work in a design office "Mostostal" Zabrze, where he worked until 1990. At the same time he worked as an academic teacher at the Silesian University of Technology, then in the Poznań University of Technology and the Academy of Fine Arts in Poznań. He was a head of the Department of Architecture, Employment and Recreation, a director of the Institute of Architecture and Planning in the Poznań University of Technology. In 2002-2008 he was a dean of the Faculty of Architecture Poznań University of Technology. In 2003 he received the title of professor.

Author of over 100 designs in the field of public architecture, industrial and residential architecture, including many distinguished and rewarded. He took part in several architectural competitions at home and abroad.

References 

1950 births
Living people
Architects from Poznań
Academic staff of the University of Fine Arts in Poznań
Academic staff of the Poznań University of Technology